Elias Corneliussen,  (3 August 1881 – 6 April 1951) was a Norwegian military officer and an admiral of the Royal Norwegian Navy. He served as acting Chief of Defence of Norway from January to May 1946.

Biography
Corneliussen was born in Kristiania (now Oslo), Norway. He was the son of  Andreas Martin Corneliussen (1852-1916) and Clara Thinn (1856-1936).

He entered the  Norwegian naval service in 1905. He served with the Naval Board of the Ministry of Defense (1909–13) and with the Royal Norwegian Naval Academy  (1913–22). Corneliussen was Head of the Admiral Staff (1934–37) and Chief (1937–40). He was a higher Norwegian naval officer during World War II. In June 1940 he arrived in the UK, where he became a Rear admiral and the chief of the Royal Norwegian Navy in 1941.

Corneliussen was decorated Commander with Star of the Royal Norwegian Order of St. Olav in 1948. He was a Commander of the British Order of the Bath, and or the French 
Légion d'honneur.

References

1881 births
1951 deaths
Military personnel from Oslo
Royal Norwegian Navy World War II admirals
Chiefs of Defence (Norway)
Commandeurs of the Légion d'honneur
Recipients of the St. Olav's Medal
Honorary Knights Commander of the Order of the Bath